Həzrəoba is a village in the municipality of Həzrə in the Qusar Rayon of Azerbaijan.

References

Populated places in Qusar District